Mangaladevi Kannagi Temple is an ancient historic temple located in the Idukki District of Kerala bordering Tamil Nadu, about 15 km from Thekkady in Idukki district and  7 km from Pazhiyankudi in Theni district.

Cheran Chenguttuvan, the king of ancient Chera nadu, had erected the temple for Kannagi around 2000 years back at Vannathipara and called it 'Kannagi Kottam' or 'Mangaladevi Kannagi temple' and performed regular pujas.

References

External links

 Thousands of devotees throng Kannagi temple The Hindu

Devi temples in Kerala
Hindu temples in Idukki district